Ndidi Madu (born March 17, 1989) is an American-born Nigerian basketball player who last played basketball for Broni and the Nigerian national team.

Florida statistics

Source

International career
She participated at the 2017 Women's Afrobasket. she averaged 3.9 pts, 3.9 RBG and 1.6 APG during the tournament.

FIBA stats

During the FIBA Africa championship for women in 2013, she averaged 9.3 points per game. During the 2014 FIBA Africa cup for women's club final round, she averaged 10pts, 3.3RPG, 0.8APG. During the 2015 Afrobasket for women; final round she averaged 8.1pts, 9.5 RPG and 0.6 APG. In the 2015 FIBA champions cup for women, she averaged 9pts, 5.8RPG, 1.1APG. During the 2016 FIBA women's Olympic qualifying tournament, she averaged 7pts, 6.5RPG, 1APG. At the 2017 Afrobasket for women she averaged 3.9pts, 3.9 RPG and 1.4 APG. She also averaged 7.2pts, 7RPG and 1.6 APG at the 2017 FIBA champions cup for women in which she played for interclube of Angola.

Retirement
On June 25, 2018, Madu announced her retirement via social media from Professional basketball ahead of the 2018 FIBA Women's World cup in Spain. She stated her retirement will help her focus on her life after Basketball which is Coaching and her foundation the Team Madu Foundation which centers on youth development.

References

1989 births
Living people
Nigerian women's basketball players
Florida Gators women's basketball players
Basketball players from Nashville, Tennessee
Forwards (basketball)
American expatriate basketball people in Italy
American expatriate basketball people in Spain
Nigerian expatriate basketball people in Italy
Nigerian expatriate basketball people in Spain
Nigerian expatriate basketball people in Montenegro
African Games silver medalists for Nigeria
African Games medalists in basketball
Competitors at the 2015 African Games
American expatriate basketball people in Montenegro
American sportspeople of Nigerian descent
African-American basketball players